Ahmed Ololade (born 13 January 1996), known professionally as Asake, Ololade Mi Asake , Mr Money is a Nigerian Afrobeats singer and songwriter. He is signed to YBNL Nation and Empire Distribution. His stage name pays homage to his mother, whose first name is Asake.

On 3 February 2023, Asake was announced by Audiomack alongside Kizz Daniel, Snazzy the Optimist and 1ucid as the top trending and most streamed artistes.

Career
Asake studied Dramatic Arts at Obafemi Awolowo University in Nigeria. Although he had been releasing music since 2018, his musical career progressed further in 2020 when he released the single "Mr. Money". A remix with Zlatan and Peruzzi followed. He broke out in the industry when he released the 2020 single "Lady". Olamide signed Asake to YBNL Records in February 2022. That same month he released his debut extended play, Ololade, which featured his breakthrough song "Omo Ope" featuring Olamide. A second single from the EP, "Sungba", was remixed a month later with a verse from Nigerian artist Burna Boy. In July 2022, Asake signed a distribution deal with Empire.

Asake released his debut studio album Mr. Money with the Vibe on 8 September 8, 2022, seven months after the release of his debut EP. The album was supported by the hit singles, "Terminator", "Peace Be Unto You" and the "Sungba" remix with Burna Boy. The album received high praise from fans in his home country of Nigeria, as well as across the world and went on to break several records globally. In 2022 Asake began his world tour, selling out the O2 Academy Brixton in London.

Several people were critically injured during a crowd crush on the final date of the tour at Brixton Academy in Brixton, London. Two people – 33-year-old concertgoer Rebecca Ikumelo and 23-year-old security guard Gaby Hutchinson – later died of their injuries.

On February 2023, Asake won the Male MVP award at the Soundcity MVP Awards which were held at the Eko Convention Centre in Lagos.

Musical style
Asake often uses uptempo Afro and Amapiano-styled production. Some listeners have also described his style as close to Fuji due to his singing in Yoruba and the use of slang in his songs.

Discography

Studio albums 
 Mr. Money with the Vibe (2022) – No. 66 US Billboard 200, No. 96 Canadian Albums Chart

Extended plays 
 Ololade (2022)

Singles

As lead artist

As featured artist

Music videos

Tours 

 Mr. Money with the Vibe (2022)

References 

Obafemi Awolowo University alumni
Nigerian musicians
Living people
21st-century Nigerian singers
Musicians from Lagos State
YBNL Nation artists
Yoruba-language singers
Afrobeat musicians
People from Lagos State
1995 births